John N. Dennis (born February 25, 1933) is an American Republican Party politician and business executive who served in the New Jersey General Assembly from 1968 to 1974, and again from 1976 to 1978.

A graduate of Montclair High School and Lehigh University, he served in the U.S. Army from 1954 to 1956.  Dennis was an executive in his family business, Annin & Co., one of the nation's largest flagmakers.

He was elected to the New Jersey State Assembly in 1967, running in Essex County District 11E.  He was the top vote getter in the Republican primary with 7,189 votes, followed by Herbert Rinaldi with 7,066 votes.  They defeated Beatrice Carlson of Montclair (5,065) and Joseph Napolitano (4,812). In the general election, Dennis and Rinaldi defeated Democrats Ralph G. Conte and John T. Regan.

Legislative redistricting in 1969 placed three incumbents in two Assembly seats: Dennis, Republican Kenneth T. Wilson, and Democrat Frank J. Dodd.  Wilson and Dennis won, with 28,233 and 27,890 votes, respectively.  His victory over Dodd was just 874 votes, 27,890 to 27,016.  Democrat William J. Fusco ran fourth with 24,658 votes.  Dodd would later return to the Assembly, move up to the Senate, serve as New Jersey Senate President and seek the Democratic nomination for Governor of New Jersey in 1981.

In 1971, when Rinaldi declined to seek re-election, Dennis ran with Republican Carl Orechio. They defeated Democrats Peter A. Torre, Jr. and David W. Conrad, by more than 7,500 votes.

Dennis lost his bid for re-election to a fourth term in the Democratic landslide of 1973, running in the newly created 27th district, which included northern Essex County suburbs of Nutley, Montclair, Bloomfield, Glen Ridge, Verona, Caldwell, Essex Fells and Cedar Grove.  In the general election, Orechio was narrowly re-elected, 27,395 votes to 26,877 votes, against Democrat James J. Mills of Glen Ridge.  The top vote getter in that race was Democrat Robert Ruane with 28,465 votes.  Dennis finished fourth with 25,764 votes.

In 1975, Dennis mounted a successful comeback bid, defeating Ruane 26,471 to 23,404.  Orechio finished first with 26,773, and Democrat Herbert Lev finished fourth with 18,886 votes.

Dennis decided to run for the New Jersey Senate in 1977, taking on one-term Democrat Carmen Orechio, Carl Orechio's brother.  He won 78% of the vote in the Republican primary against Francis M. Adams, but lost the general election to Orechio by 918 votes, 25,773 (51%)to 24,855 (49.%).

References

1933 births
Living people
Lehigh University alumni
Montclair High School (New Jersey) alumni
Politicians from Essex County, New Jersey
Republican Party members of the New Jersey General Assembly